Ilian Dimov Iliev (born 2 July 1968) is a Bulgarian professional football manager and former player. He is the head coach at Bulgarian First League club Cherno More.

He is best known for having played for Portuguese club Benfica and Bulgarian sides Cherno More and Levski Sofia. In his professional career as a footballer, he received 34 international caps for the Bulgaria national team.

Club career
Iliev was born in Varna and started to play football at his hometown club Cherno More. In his youth he was also a talented wrestler, but chose to dedicate himself to football. After his good performances in the Cherno More youth teams were caught, he was promoted into the first team in 1986. For five seasons, between 1986 and 1991, Iliev made 123 appearances and scored 31 goals for the club. He was transferred to Levski Sofia in the 1991–92 season, winning three times the Bulgarian A PFG and one Bulgarian Cup in five years with the club. In 1995, Iliev moved to Benfica and won the Taça de Portugal in the 1995–96 season. In his career he also played for Slavia Sofia, Turkish Bursaspor, Greek AEK Athens as well as for the Portuguese clubs Marítimo and Salgueiros. He finished his career at his first club Cherno More Varna in 2004.

International career
Iliev earned his first cap with Bulgaria in a friendly match against Turkey on 21 August 1991 in Stara Zagora. He registered 34 caps for his country, scoring three goals. Iliev was part of the Bulgarian squad at the 1998 FIFA World Cup in France, where he played in three games.

Coaching career
After retiring in 2004, Iliev pursued a career as a coach. In June 2004, he was appointed as a manager in his first club Cherno More Varna. However, on 3 March 2006, after a two years spell at the Sailors, he resigned after a home 0–1 loss against Rodopa Smolyan. Since 2006, he serves as the manager of Beroe Stara Zagora, making him one of the longest serving coach in a Bulgarian football club. Under his management in the 2009–10 season, Beroe won a historical first Bulgarian Cup and consequently achieved a participation in the UEFA Europa League qualification stages. Iliev has been voted best coach in the Bulgarian championship for the season 2009–10 by the association of Bulgarian football players.

On 6 April 2012 it was announced that Iliev will be the new manager of Levski Sofia. He was to complete the season with Beroe and then start his new job at the beginning of the 2012–13 season. His contract will be until June 2015.

On 12 April 2013, he was fired by Levski Sofia and was replaced by Nikolay Mitov.

In mid May 2014, Iliev held final talks to become the manager of Angolan club Inter Luanda. Compatriot Petar Kostadinov was announced as his assistant. He returned to his country in 2016, being appointed as manager of Loko Plovdiv. Iliev came close to securing European club football for the team, as the "smurfs" finished in 5th place in the standings during the 2015/2016 A PFG.  On 17 October 2016, following a 1–2 defeat by Lokomotiv GO, Iliev announced that he is leaving Lokomotiv Plovdiv. In early 2017, Iliev signed a contract to manage newly promoted Altai Semey from the Kazakhstan Premier League, but stepped down in February 2017, as the club eventually did not receive a license for the top division.

On 9 June 2017, Iliev was appointed as manager of First League club Vereya. Following a successful stint with Vereya, in December 2017 he returned as head coach to his hometown club Cherno More.

Career statistics

Club

International

International goals

Honours

Player
Levski Sofia
Bulgarian League: 1992–93, 1993–94, 1994–95
Bulgarian Cup: 1991–92, 1993–94

Benfica
Portuguese Cup: 1995–96

Manager
Beroe
Bulgarian Cup: 2009–10
Bulgarian League Coach of the Season: 2009–10

Individual
Manager of the Year in Bulgarian football (2021)

References

External links
 
 
 Profile at LevskiSofia.info

1968 births
Living people
Bulgarian footballers
Sportspeople from Varna, Bulgaria
PFC Cherno More Varna players
PFC Levski Sofia players
Altay S.K. footballers
S.L. Benfica footballers
PFC Slavia Sofia players
Bursaspor footballers
AEK Athens F.C. players
C.S. Marítimo players
S.C. Salgueiros players
Bulgarian football managers
PFC Beroe Stara Zagora managers
PFC Cherno More Varna managers
PFC Levski Sofia managers
G.D. Interclube managers
PFC Lokomotiv Plovdiv managers
1998 FIFA World Cup players
Bulgaria international footballers
First Professional Football League (Bulgaria) players
Primeira Liga players
Süper Lig players
Super League Greece players
Expatriate footballers in Portugal
Bulgarian expatriate sportspeople in Portugal
Expatriate footballers in Turkey
Expatriate footballers in Greece
Bulgarian expatriate footballers
Bulgarian expatriate football managers
Association football midfielders
Expatriate football managers in Angola